Chashi Nazrul Islam (11 October 1941 – 11 January 2015) was a Bangladeshi film director and producer. He won Bangladesh National Film Award for Best Director twice for the films Shuvoda (1986) and Hangor Nodi Grenade (1997). He was awarded Ekushey Padak in 2004 by the Government of Bangladesh.

Early life and career 
Islam was born on 23 October 1941 at Shomoshpur village in Sreenagar Upazila of Munshiganj to Mosleh Uddin Khan and Shayesta Khanom. He was the eldest among four brothers and three sisters. His father was a service holder at Jamshedpur, India. At the age of 16, his father died. He got a job at the office of his uncle, the then auditor general of Pakistan. He was a member of the theatre organisation Krishti Sangha. After Islam got laid off from that job, he started to perform on radio programs in 1965.

Islam's brother in law Syed Awal, who was the chief assistant of director Fateh Lohani, introduced him to Lohani. He was first cast in a minor acting role in Asiya (1961). He got his breakthrough as an assistant director to Obaidul Huq in the film Dui Diganto (1964). At the same time, he directed and voiced radio dramas including Ramer Sumoti, Socrates and Sakhina Birangana.

Islam served as the chairman of the Bangladesh Film Director's Association, as a member of the censor board and of the joint production committee.

Death 
At age 73, Islam died of liver cancer at the Labaid Hospital in Dhaka, Bangladesh on 11 January 2015. Two of his films released after his death, Ontorongo (6 December 2015) and Bhul Jodi Hoy (8 January 2016).

Filmography

Awards

References

External links
 
 Chashi Nazrul Islam, Munshigonj
 Chashi Nazrul Islam, Gunijon

1941 births
2015 deaths
Bangladeshi film directors
Bangladeshi film producers
Best Director National Film Award (Bangladesh) winners
Recipients of the Ekushey Padak